Yves Sikubwabo (born 17 April 1993) is a Canadian long-distance runner.

In 2019, he competed in the senior men's race at the 2019 IAAF World Cross Country Championships held in Aarhus, Denmark. He finished in 91st place.

References

External links 
 

Living people
1993 births
Place of birth missing (living people)
Canadian male long-distance runners
Canadian male cross country runners